Yohannes  is a masculine given name.

People

Ras Mengesha Yohannes, acknowledged "natural" son and designated heir of Yohannes IV
Araya Selassie Yohannes (1870–1888), son of Yohannes IV and nominated Crown Prince
Aster Yohannes, veteran of Eritrean People's Liberation Front and an independence activist
Daniel Yohannes (born 1952), Ethiopian-American businessman and philanthropist
Dawit Yohannes (1956–2019), first Speaker of the Ethiopian Parliament's House of Peoples' Representatives
Fesshaye Yohannes (1954–?), Eritrean journalist
Musse Yohannes (born 1958), Ethiopian former cyclist
Nebahne Yohannes, claimed king
Tereza Yohannes (born 1982), Ethiopian long-distance runner
Zekarias Yohannes (1925–2016), Eritrean Catholic bishop
Yohannes Bahçecioğlu (born 1988), German-Turkish former footballer
Yohannes Gebregeorgis, founder of Ethiopia Reads
Yohannes Gebremeskel Tesfamariam (born 1960), head of Mission and Force Commander of UNISFA from 2013 to 2014
Yohannes Gugarats, an Armenian military leader in early 18th century
Yohannes Haile-Selassie (born 1961), Ethiopian paleoanthropologist
Yohannes Mohamed (born 1948), Ethiopian long-distance runner
Yohannes Sahle (born 1966), Ethiopian football manager
Yohannes Tikabo (born 1974), Eritrean singer-songwriter
Yohannes Tilahun (born 1993), Eritrean footballer
Yohannes Yual, leader of the South Sudan Defense Forces

See also 
 Yohannes (disambiguation)
 Johannes

Masculine given names